Kyivo-Pechers’ka Lavra, also known as the Kyiv Monastery of the Caves, is a historic Eastern Orthodox Christian monastery which gave its name to one of the city districts where it is located in Kyiv.

Since its foundation as the cave monastery in 1051, the Lavra has been a preeminent center of Eastern Orthodox Christianity in Eastern Europe.

Etymology and other names

The word pechera means cave. The word lavra is used to describe high-ranking male monasteries for monks of the Eastern Orthodox Church. Therefore, the name of the monastery is also translated as Kyiv Cave Monastery, Kyiv Caves Monastery or the Kyiv Monastery of the Caves (на печерах).

History

Foundation and early history 
According to the Primary Chronicle, in the early 11th century, Anthony, a Christian monk from Esphigmenon monastery on Mount Athos, originally from Liubech of the Principality of Chernigov, returned to Rus' and settled in Kyiv as a missionary of monastic tradition to Kyivan Rus'. He chose a cave at the Berestov Mount that overlooked the Dnieper River and a community of disciples soon grew. Prince Iziaslav I of Kyiv ceded the whole mount to the Anthonite monks who founded a monastery built by architects from Constantinople.

Modern history 
Together with the Saint Sophia Cathedral, the Kyiv Pechersk Lavra has been inscribed as a UNESCO World Heritage Site since 1990. The monastery complex is considered a separate national historic-cultural preserve (sanctuary), the national status to which was granted on 13 March 1996. The Lavra is not only located in another part of the city, but is part of a different national sanctuary than Saint Sophia Cathedral. While being a cultural attraction, the monastery is once again active, with over 100 monks in residence. It was named one of the Seven Wonders of Ukraine on 21 August 2007.

Until the end of 2022, jurisdiction over the site had been divided between the state museum, National Kyiv-Pechersk Historic-Cultural Preserve, and the Ukrainian Orthodox Church (Moscow Patriarchate) (UOC-MP) as the site of the chief monastery of that Church and the residence of its leader, Onufrius, Metropolitan of Kyiv and All Ukraine. In January 2023, the Ukrainian government terminated the UOC-MP's lease of the Dormition Cathedral and the Refectory Church (also known as the Trapezna Church), returning those properties to direct state control. It also announced that the Orthodox Church of Ukraine (OCU) had been granted permission to celebrate a Christmas service in the Dormition Cathedral, on 7 January 2023, Orthodox Christmas by the Old Calendar, a service which was celebrated by Metropolitan Epiphanius at 9am that day.

Hegumens

The hegumens of Kyiv Pechersk Lavra are listed below.

Buildings and structures

The Kyiv Pechersk Lavra contains numerous architectural monuments, ranging from bell towers to cathedrals to cave systems and to strong stone fortification walls. The main attractions of the Lavra include the Great Lavra Belltower, and the Dormition Cathedral, destroyed in World War II, and fully reconstructed in recent years. Other churches and cathedrals of the Lavra include: the Refectory Church, the Church of All Saints, the Church of the Saviour at Berestove, the Church of the Exaltation of Cross, the Church of the Trinity, the Church of the Nativity of the Virgin, the Church of the Conception of St. Anne, and the Church of the Life-Giving Spring. The Lavra also contains many other constructions, including: the St. Nicholas Monastery, the Kyiv Theological Academy and Seminary, and the Debosquette Wall.

In March 2023 Ukrainian authorities claimed that Metropolitan  had built 36 buildings unapproved by (the state) at the Kyiv Pechersk Lavra site, including his own mansion, and had developed "diversified commercial activities."

Great Lavra Belltower

The Great Lavra Belltower is one of the most notable features of the Kyiv skyline and among the main attractions of the Lavra. 96.5 meters in height, it was the tallest free-standing belltower at the time of its construction in 1731–1745, and was designed by the architect Johann Gottfried Schädel. It is a Classical style construction and consists of tiers, surmounted by a gilded dome.

Dormition Cathedral

Built in the 11th century, the main church of the monastery was destroyed during the World War II.

In 1928, the monastery was converted into an anti-religious museum park by the Soviet authorities and no efforts were provided to restore the church after it was destroyed. The temple was finally restored in 1995 after Ukraine obtained its independence and the construction was accomplished in two years. The new Dormition Church was consecrated in 2000.

Gate Church of the Trinity

The Gate Church of the Trinity is located atop the Holy Gates, which houses the entrance to the monastery. According to a legend, this church was founded by the Chernihiv Prince Sviatoslav II. It was built atop an ancient stone church which used to stand in its place.
After the fire of 1718, the church was rebuilt, its revered facades and interior walls enriched with ornate stucco work made by craftsman V. Stefaovych.
In the 18th century, a new gilded pear-shaped dome was built, the facade and exterior walls were decorated with stucco-moulded plant ornaments and a vestibule built of stone attached to the north end. In the early 20th century, the fronts and the walls flanking the entrance were painted by icon painters under the guidance of V. Sonin.
The interior of the Gate Trinity Church contains murals by the early 18th century painter Alimpy Galik.

Refectory chambers with Church of the Saints Anthony and Theodosius

The refectory chambers with the Church of the Saints Anthony and Theodosius is the third in a series of temples. The original temple was built in the 12th century and no drawings or visual depictions of it remain. The second temple was built at the time of the Cossack Hetmanate and was disassembled by the Russian authorities in the 19th century. It was replaced with the current temple, often referred to as the Refectory Church of the Kyiv Pechersk Lavra.

All Saints Church
All Saints Church, erected in 1696–1698, is a fine specimen of Ukrainian baroque architecture. Characteristic of the church facades are rich architectural embellishments. In 1905, students of the Lavra art school painted the interior walls of the church. The carved wooden iconostasis is multi-tiered and was made for All Saints Church in the early 18th century.

Church of the Saviour at Berestov

The Church of the Saviour at Berestove is located to the North of the Kyiv Pechersk Lavra. It was constructed in the village of Berestove around the start of the 11th century during the reign of Prince Vladimir Monomakh. It later served as the mausoleum of the Monomakh dynasty, also including Yuri Dolgoruki, the founder of Moscow. Despite being outside the Lavra fortifications, the Church of the Saviour at Berestove is part of the Kyiv Pechersk Lavra complex.

Caves

The Kyiv Pechersk Lavra caverns are a system of narrow underground corridors (about 1-1½ metres wide and 2-2½ metres high), along with numerous living quarters and underground chapels. In 1051, the monk Anthony settled in an old cave in a hill near the Kyiv Pechersk Lavra. This cave received additions including corridors and a church, and is now the Far Caves. In 1057, Anthony moved to a cave near the Upper Lavra, now called the Near Caves.

Foreign travellers in the 16th–17th centuries wrote that the catacombs of the Lavra stretched for hundreds of kilometres, reaching as far as Moscow and Novgorod, spreading awareness of the Kyiv Pechersk Lavra.

Burials
There are over a hundred burials in the Lavra. Below are the most notable ones
 Ilya Muromets – in the caves (c. 11th–12th century)
 Nestor the Chronicler – in the Near Caves (c. 1114)
 Saint Kuksha – in the Near Caves (c. 1114)
 Alipy of the Caves – in the Near Caves (c. 1114)
 Agapetus of Pechersk – in the Near Caves (c. 11th century)
 Oleg son of Vladimir II Monomakh – in the Church of the Saviour at Berestove (c. 12th century)
 Eufemia of Kyiv daughter of Vladimir II Monomakh – in the Church of the Saviour at Berestove (1139)
 Yuri Dolgoruki – in the Church of the Saviour at Berestove (1157)
 Skirgaila – regent Grand Duke of Lithuania (1397)
 Konstanty Ostrogski – near the Cathedral of the Dormition (1530)
 Vasily Kochubey – near the Refectory Church (1708)
 Ivan Iskra – near the Refectory Church (1708)
 Pyotr Stolypin – near the Refectory Church (1911)
 St. Spyridon – in the caves (c. 19th–20th century)
 Pope Clement I – his head in the Far Caves (his remaining relics brought to San Clemente in Rome by Sts. Cyril and Methodius)

During the Soviet era, the bodies of the saints that lay in the caves were left uncovered due to the regime's disregard for religion. However, after the fall of the Soviet Union, the bodies were covered with a cloth and to this day remain in the same state.

Museum

The Kyiv Pechersk Lavra is one of the largest museums in Kyiv. The exposition is the actual ensemble of the Upper (Near Caves) and Lower (Far Caves) Lavra territories, which house many architectural relics of the past. The collection within the churches and caves includes articles of precious metal, prints, higher clergy portraits and rare church hierarchy photographs. The main exposition contains articles from 16th to early 20th centuries, which include chalices, crucifixes, and textiles from 16th–19th centuries, with needlework and embroidery of Ukrainian masters. The remainder of the collection consists of pieces from the Lavra's Printing House and the Lavra's Icon Painting Workshop.
The museum provides tours of the catacombs, which contain remains of Eastern Orthodox saints or their relics. The Caves are of geological interest because they are excavated into loess ground. They form one of the most extensive occurrences of loess caves in the world.

The Lavra museums include:
Museum of Historical Treasures of Ukraine
Martynivka Treasure
Book and print history museum
Museum of Ukrainian Folk Art
Theater and film arts museum
State historical library

Images

See also
Šimon
Yakun
List of UNESCO World Heritage Sites in Ukraine

Notes

References

Sources

 Kyiv Pechersk Lavra article in Brockhaus and Efron Encyclopedic Dictionary.
 Kyivan Cave Monastery  in the Encyclopedia of Ukraine .
 Schotkina, Kateryna. "Kyiv Pechersk Lavra: Take away and Divide" in Zerkalo Nedeli, 11–17 November 2006.

External links

 Holy Dormition Kyiv-Pechersk Lavra – Official site 
 National Kyiv-Pechersk Historico-Cultural Preserve
 Drawings and Sketches by Students of the Kyiv-Pechersk Lavra Monastery Workshop
 M. Z. Petrenko. Cave labyrinths on the territory of the National Kyiv-Pechersk Historical and Cultural Reserve. Photo essay. Kyiv, Mystetstvo, 1974. 
 National Kyiv-Pechersk Historical and Cultural Reserve. A set of postcards. Kyiv, Mystetstvo, 1977. 
 Video "Kyiv Pechersk Lavra (4k UltraHD)"

 
Eastern Orthodox monasteries in Ukraine
Monasteries of the Ukrainian Orthodox Church (Moscow Patriarchate)
World Heritage Sites in Ukraine
Buildings and structures in Kyiv
Tourist attractions in Kyiv
Christian monasteries established in the 11th century
1051 establishments in Europe
Eastern Orthodox church buildings
Historic sites in Ukraine
Landmarks in Kyiv
Protected areas of Ukraine
Protected areas established in 1926
Monuments and memorials in Kyiv
Religious museums in Ukraine
Cave monasteries
Cemeteries in Kyiv
Pecherskyi District
Symbols of Kyiv
Lavras